Naeema Al-Gasseer (born in Manama, Bahrain) is an academically trained nurse and midwife, global health manager and resident representative, who has been working for the World Health Organization in their Eastern Mediterranean region and national health programs for more than 30 years. As such, her professional career encompasses experience in national, regional and international health systems, in women's health, as well as in humanitarian and development programs.

Early life and education 
Born and raised in Bahrain's capital Manama, al-Gasseer was educated at a local secondary school for girls. In 1982, she earned a Bachelor's degree in Nursing Sciences from the American University of Beirut at the time of the civil war in Lebanon. In 1987, she received her MSc in Nursing Sciences (Nurse-Midwifery) from the University of Illiois at Chicago, United States, where she also earned her PhD in Nursing, with specialization in Women's Health, in 1990.

Career 
Before her assignments for the United Nations, al-Gasseer worked for the government of Bahrain, serving in both academic positions  and health services, and as advisor to the Ministries of Health in the Gulf region. She is the first woman from Bahrain who started a career in the World Health Organization. In 1996, she was also seconded to the United Nations Population Fund.

From 1999 – 2003, she began as Senior Scientist for Nursing and Midwifery at the Health System Cluster of the WHO Headquarters in Geneva. During this time, al-Gasseer established global policies for nursing and midwifery development. This resulted in the first 'Global Strategic Directions for Nursing and Midwifery', and was based on a global survey including nine partnerships and that lead to resolutions of the World Health Assembly. Further, she served for UNFPA/WHO as Regional Advisor in reproductive health and family planning in Arab States and Eastern Europe in countries such as Jordan, Sudan, Lebanon, Yemen, Syria, and the occupied Palestinian territories.

In December 2003, al-Gasseer was appointed as WHO's resident representative in Iraq. Further, she served as WHO representative in Sudan and as WHO Assistant Regional Director in Cairo, Egypt. There, she was in charge of response towards emergencies and humanitarian crises and for research related to public health issues in 22 countries of the Eastern Mediterranean region. Since 2019, she has been serving as WHO representative for Egypt, where she also is in charge of the organization's campaign against the COVID-19 pandemic.

As part of her responsibilities, al-Gasseer has been leading the WHO's cooperation with national public health programmes, such as fighting against diseases like cholera, hepatitis and HIV/AIDS. Further, her mandate typically encompasses support for health facilities, mental health and training of health-related personnel. She has published scientific reports and studies on subjects such as professional training of midwives and nurses, women's health issues or global health policiy. As a leading manager for health systems, she has personally been credited for successfully networking with ministries, NGOs, international donors and organizations. - In this quality, she has appeared as keynote speaker on health and development for different stakeholders from civil society, local communities or business representatives.

Awards and distinctions 
In 2005, al-Gasseer was awarded an Honorary Doctorate from Glasgow Caledonian University in Scotland, and in 2010, the American Academy of Nursing Fellowship Award. In 2016, she was bestowed the 'First Rank for Competence' by the King of Bahrain, and in 2018, she received an award as Arab Woman of the Year by the London Arabia Organisation in recognition of her leadership role in public health in several countries.

See also 

 Women's health
 World Health Report

References

External links 
List of selected academic publications by Naeema al-Gasseer
WHO Regional Office for the Eastern Mediterranean Official Website
WHO Official Website

Living people
Year of birth missing (living people)
World Health Organization
United Nations specialized agencies people
Health officials
People by intergovernmental organization
People in public health
American University of Beirut alumni
University of Illinois Chicago alumni
Bahraini officials of the United Nations
People from Manama
Nursing administrators
Bahraini midwives
Bahraini women nurses